Austin station may refer to:
 Austin station (Texas), an Amtrak station in Austin, Texas
 Austin station (CTA Blue Line) in Chicago
 Austin station (CTA Green Line), also in Chicago
 Austin station (MTR), in Hong Kong

See also
 Austin (disambiguation)